Richard Hallowell Hoppin (February 22, 1913 – November 1, 1991) was an American musicologist.

Hoppin received his BA from Carleton College in 1936 after spending two years at the Paris Ecole Normale de Musique. He studied at Harvard University, obtaining his MA in 1938, and taught at Mount Union College from 1938 to 1942. After serving in World War II he returned to Harvard, completing his Ph.D. in 1952. From 1949 to 1961 he taught at The University of Texas, and from 1961 at Ohio State University.

Hoppin's scholarship dealt primarily with medieval music; he specialized in the Music of Cyprus in the 14th and 15th centuries. He published Medieval Music in 1978, which is a standard English-language work in the field.

Books
The Motets of the Early Fifteenth-Century Manuscript J.II.9. in the Biblioteca Nazionale of Turin (dissertation, Harvard U., 1952)
Medieval Music (New York, 1978; French translation, 1991; Spanish translation, 2000; Slovak translation, 2007) [with accompanying anthology]

References
Paula Morgan, "Richard Hoppin". The New Grove Dictionary of Music and Musicians online.

1913 births
1991 deaths
Carleton College alumni
Harvard University alumni
University of Mount Union faculty
University of Texas at Austin faculty
Ohio State University faculty
École Normale de Musique de Paris alumni
20th-century American musicologists
American expatriates in France